Sapouy is a department or commune of Ziro Province in southern Burkina Faso. The capital is Sapouy. The population of the department was 86,729 in 2019.

Towns and villages

Sapouy 6187 (capital)
Balogo	1612
Baouiga	822
Baouiga-Yorgo	612
Bassawarga	548
Bouem	307
Bougagnonon	840
Boulou	752
Boom	233
Boro	1101
Diallo	570
Diaré	834
Dianzoé	587
Faro	925
Idiou	552
Guirsé	265
Gallo	1159
Kada	546
Kation	735
Kouli	293
Koutera	836
Konon	387
Nadonon	621
Ladiga	308
Latian	1073
Lou	678
Nabilpaga-Yorga	239
Napo-Nabilpaga	1035
Nébrou	1051
Nékrou	936
Néliri	1235
Obonon	1330
Ouayalguin	59
Poun	558
Santio	1033
Sobaka	584
Souboré	649
Souli	264
Sia	465
Tiaré	2012
Tiakouré	268
Tiabien-Kasso	682
Tiana	433
Tiaburo	571
Tiabien	1023
Tiagao	806
Yilou	437
Zavara	577

References

Departments of Burkina Faso
Ziro Province